The Second United Indonesia Cabinet was inaugurated on 22 October 2009, two days after the inauguration of Susilo Bambang Yudhoyono as President of Indonesia for the second term. The cabinet consists of members from Yudhoyono's Democratic Party and its coalition partners (the Prosperous Justice Party, the National Mandate Party, the United Development Party, National Awakening Party and the Golkar Party) as well as non-party figures.

Cabinet lineup 
President Yudhoyono officially announced the cabinet lineup on 21 October 2009 at 10 pm, one day after his inauguration. On October 18, 2011, Yudhoyono announced the reshuffled cabinet.

Other officials

Cabinet Secretary

Heads of Government Agencies
These positions as heads of government agencies were announced at the same time as the cabinet lineup.

Deputy Ministers 
Deputy ministers are not members of the cabinet.

References

See also

 Politics of Indonesia
 Kabinet Indonesia Bersatu II

Post-Suharto era
Cabinets of Indonesia
2009 establishments in Indonesia
Cabinets established in 2009